The Norwegian Institute for Defence Studies (IFS) is a defence research institute based in Oslo, Norway. It was established in 1980 and is part of the Norwegian Defence University College, itself part of the Norwegian Armed Forces. .

It is a politically independent institute within the Norwegian Armed Forces. Its main activities are concentrated in the areas of research, teaching and dissemination.

It is divided into four Centres: Centre for Norwegian and European Security, Centre for Civil-Military Relations, Centre for Asian Studies and Centre for Transatlantic Studies. The current director of the IFS is Kjell Inge Bjerga.

Employees
Olav Riste

See also
 Norwegian Defence Research Establishment

References

External links
 Official website

Research institutes in Norway
Education in Oslo
Independent research institutes
Social science institutes
1980 establishments in Norway